The 1989 UC Santa Barbara Gauchos football team represented the University of California, Santa Barbara (UCSB) as an independent during the 1989 NCAA Division III football season. Led by Mike Warren in his fourth and final season as head coach, the Gauchos compiled a record of 8–2 and outscored their opponents 313 to 150 for the season. The team played home games at Harder Stadium in Santa Barbara, California.

Warren was finished his four-year stint as head coach with a record of 26–13 for a winning percentage of .667.

Schedule

Notes

References

UC Santa Barbara
UC Santa Barbara Gauchos football seasons
UC Santa Barbara Gauchos football